This is a list of seasons completed by the Michigan Wolverines men's basketball team. The team played its first game in January 1909. Michigan's highest-scoring team, measured in points per game, was the 1965–66 team led by Cazzie Russell, which averaged 91.9 points per game. The program's only national championship was won by the 1988–89 team led by Glen Rice, which averaged 91.7 points per game.

Seasons

  Fisher served as interim coach during the 1989 NCAA tournament after Bill Frieder resigned. Michigan credits the 1988–89 regular season to Frieder and the NCAA tournament to Fisher.
  Michigan vacated its two 1992 Final Four games and its status as tournament runner-up. Official record is 24–8.
  Entire season, including postseason tournament appearances, later vacated by the school.
  Due to NCAA sanctions, a total of 36 wins were vacated: 24 wins from the 1997–98 season, including 11 Big Ten regular season wins, three wins in the Big Ten Tournament, and one win in the NCAA Tournament, and 12 wins in the 1998–99 season (including five Big Ten regular season wins). Michigan's 1998 Big Ten Tournament championship was also vacated. Originally, Michigan finished fourth in the Big Ten in 1997–98 and ninth in 1998–99. The punishment cost the 2002–2003 team its postseason eligibility.
  Head coach Juwan Howard was suspended for the final five regular season games of the 2021–22 season. Martelli served as interim head coach in his absence.
  Michigan's total record includes games subsequently vacated by the school.

Notes

Michigan
Michigan Wolverines men's basketball seasons
Michigan Wolverines basketball seasons